Gymnocalycium mihanovichii is a species of cactus from South America. The most popular cultivars are varied mutants which completely lack chlorophyll, exposing the red, orange, or yellow pigmentation. These mutant strains are often grafted onto the hylocereus cactus, and the combined plant is called a "Moon Cactus". Moon cacti are commonly grown as houseplants and are also known as Ruby Ball, Red Cap, Red Hibotan, or Hibotan cacti.

Background
Gymnocalycium mihanovichii is found growing at lower elevations up to 500 meters in Paraguay and northeast Argentina. The species was discovered there in 1903 by Alberto Vojtěch Frič.

The first description of Echinocactus mihanovichii was published in 1905 by Robert Louis August Maximilian Gürke. Nathaniel Lord Britton and Joseph Nelson Rose placed it in the genus Gymnocalycium in 1922.

Gymnocalycium mihanovichii is very variable, therefore numerous varieties have been described. Frequently found in culture are mutants of cultivated individuals—color forms that are viable only when grafted since they can hardly assimilate—due to the lack of chlorophyll in the plant cells. In nurseries, it is often then grafted onto another succulent plant Hylocereus. The most popular cultivars are mutants that do not contain chlorophyll at all, so that the underlying red, orange, or yellow pigments become visible. Because chlorophyll is necessary for photosynthesis, these mutants die as seedlings unless grafted onto another cactus with normal chlorophyll.

In the IUCN Red List of Endangered Species the species is referred to as "Least Concern (LC)", as not endangered.

Description
The individually growing Gymnocalycium mihanovichii have a broad-spherical, gray-green, often reddish overgrown plant body, which reaches stature heights and diameter of 3 to 5 centimeters. The usually 8 ribs are narrow-edged and slightly notched. The 5 to 6 weak, pliable, and slightly curved thorns are greyish-yellow, between 0.8 and 1 centimeter long and partly fall off. The 4 to 5  cm long, bell-shaped to funnel-shaped flowers are yellowish-olive to light olive green. The light green stamens are in two rows. The stylus is also light green; the scar yellowish. The fruits are spindle-shaped.

The species belonging to the "Hibotan" cultivar have a different color from the natural one because it is deprived of chlorophyll and, being unable to live on its roots, it is necessary that it is grafted onto another Cactacea, generally Hylocereus.

Cultivars
Cactus can be easily propagated by cutting or offset propagating method.

Gymnocalycium produces offsets easily, even when grafted, which can then be grafted to a new base, perpetuating the plant. Even the best grafts only last a few years, as the base grows faster than the Gymnocalycium. After that point, the difference in speed between the two becomes too great for the graft to hold together, and so they split apart. The scion can, however, be re-grafted back on to the rootstock after this.

The colored species comprise a large group of popular mutants, characterized by more or less colored bodies. They can be red, orange, purplish, yellow, or even white. The first totally decolored mutants were called cv. 'Hibotan'. The first only partially de-chlorophyll were called cv. 'Hibotan Nishiki' and can be grown on its own roots. The 'Nishiki' all contain chlorophyll but with many anthocyanin and appear deep brown. By the time many other colored were obtained and some have special names such as 'Akagurohibotan-Nishiki' or 'Pink-Kuro'.

Habitat
A number of Gymnocalyciums prefer shade in the wild, being cloaked under shrubs or grasses, while others prefer abundant sunlight. Moon cactus, for one, thrives best in bright, indirect light, and can be grown indoors year round. Those preferring plentiful sunshine may need covering from the sun in the hottest months, but exaggerating this will result in loss of flowers. The balance of the potting medium should be adequate to allow decent drainage so that the plants do not sit in marshy soil for more than a day or two after watering. During the summer months, the plant may need frequent watering, though those in small pots would need weekly watering. Nevertheless, the compost should be virtually dry before re-watering. Watering in the winter months is unnecessary.

Gallery

References

<small>14 "HOW TO GRAFT A CACTUS". Succulents Box. Retrieved 2020-11-22.

mihanovichii
Cacti of South America
Flora of Argentina
Garden plants of South America
House plants